The surname Si 斯 is a Chinese surname that is now mainly distributed in the Sze Residence Township in Zhuji, China. There are Ma, Xing, Du, Zhang, Chen, Jin, Zhou, Xu, Huang, Si, Cai, Yu, Lou and other surnames in Sze Residence Township (Zhuji has a population of about 12,000 people with the surname of Si).

According to historical records, it comes from Shǐ, which was given to Shi Wei by Sun Quan.

It is used in Korean as the Baekje surname Sa.

It is listed as one of the Eight surnames of Zhurong.

See also 

 Si Xinliang
 
 Si Xingjian
 Si (surname)

References

External links 
  《欽定古今圖書集成·明倫彙編·氏族典·斯姓部》，出自蒋廷锡《古今圖書集成》
Chinese-language surnames
Eight surnames of Zhurong